Malcolm Fraser (1930–2015) was an Australian politician who served as Prime Minister of Australia from 1975 to 1983.

Malcolm Fraser may also refer to:
Sir Malcolm Fraser (surveyor) (1834–1900), British surveyor and administrator in Australia
Malcolm Fraser (artist) (1868–1949), Canadian-born artist and illustrator
Sir Malcolm Fraser, 1st Baronet (1878–1949), British newspaper editor and political agent
Malcolm Fraser (philanthropist) (1903–1994), American philanthropist and businessman who founded the Genuine Parts Company and the Stuttering Foundation of America
Malcolm Fraser (architect) (born 1959), founder of Malcolm Fraser Architects
Eadie Fraser (1860–1886), full name Malcolm James Eadie Fraser, Scottish footballer